ASP, (Atmospheric Sounding Projectile is the designation of an American sounding rocket family. ASP-I was used to sample nuclear explosions and resultant clouds The ASP was the fastest single stage sounding rocket when developed. The Asp was manufactured by Cooper Development Corporation, California. The solid propellant motor was made by Grand Central Rocket company.

The ASP-I has a payload ability of 11 kg, a maximum flight height of 110 km, a takeoff thrust of 42.00 kN, a mass of 111 kg, a diameter of 0.17 m, a length of 3.68 m and a fin span of 0.51 m. The ASP rocket was used in connection with other sounding rockets.

ASP-II (Cleansweep I) had a slightly lower total impulse and a significantly shorter burn time (3.6 seconds vs. 5.6). Cleansweep I was used to collect particulate air sample from nuclear explosions at the Nevada Test Range.

ASP-III (Cleansweep II) had slightly lower specs. It was also modified for use in the South Pacific. Two or four  LOKI rockets were strapped on the basic ASP. Results were less than expected and ASP-III was a failure.

ASP-IV used an ASP motor case with B.F. Goodrich E-107M propellant.

ASP-V was to utilize a polysulfide propellant but erratic burning and resultant burn through proved insoluble. ASP-V was canceled.

ASP was combined with a Nike booster to create the ASPAN which exceeded performance of the Nike-Cajun and Nike Deacon.

When ASP-I was combined with a one-fifth scale sergeant the ASCAMP (also known as Nike-ASP.) for JPL. ASCAMP had  to be launched from a remotely controlled launcher due to the necessary closeness to the nuclear blast.

In NASA  service it was flown from a number of locations as a sounding Rocket. As was the Nike-ASP. ASP was used for a variety of uses, including research into hypersonic speed and to propel rocket sleds. The selection by NASA of the Apache and Javelin rockets for the jobs performed by ASP led to its retirement.

References

Books

External links 
 Article title

Sounding rockets of the United States